Nigel Jenkins (20 July 1949 – 28 January 2014) was an Anglo-Welsh poet. He was an editor, journalist, psychogeographer, broadcaster and writer of creative non-fiction, as well as being a lecturer at Swansea University and director of the creative writing programme there.

Early life
Jenkins was born on 20 July 1949 in Gorseinon, Wales, and was brought up on a farm on the former Kilvrough estate on the Gower Peninsula, near Swansea. He was educated at the University of Essex.

Career

Jenkins first came to prominence as one of the Welsh Arts Council's Three Young Anglo-Welsh Poets (the title of a 1974 collection featuring Jenkins, Tony Curtis and Duncan Bush – all winners of the Council's Young Poets Prize). In 1976, he was given an Eric Gregory Award by the Society of Authors.

Jenkins would go on to publish several collections of poetry over the course of his life, including, in 2002, the first haiku collection from a Welsh publisher (Blue: 101 Haiku, Senryu and Tanka). His poetry has been translated into French, German, Hungarian, Dutch and Russian, and his translations of modern Welsh poetry have appeared in numerous magazines and anthologies worldwide, including The Bloodaxe Anthology of Modern Welsh Poetry (2003). In 1998, the Russian journal Literatura Innostranya (Foreign Literature) published a selection of his poems, translated into Russian, for a feature on his work. He also composed poetry for public places – executed in stone, steel, neon, glass and other materials – in response to commissions from various public bodies.

A former newspaper journalist, Jenkins was an accomplished writer of prose. In 1996, he won the Wales Book of the Year prize for his travel book Gwalia in Khasia (1995) – the story of the Welsh Calvinistic Methodists' Mission to the Khasi Hills in north-east India (1841–1969). Jenkins also edited an accompanying anthology of poetry and prose from the Khasi Hills, entitled Khasia in Gwalia. In 2001, Gomer Press published a selection of his essays and articles as Footsore on the Frontier and, in 2008, Real Swansea – the first of his three contributions to Seren's series of psychogeographic guide books – was released to much acclaim. A second volume (Real Swansea Two) was published in 2012, followed by a third, posthumous volume in 2014 (Real Gower), completing an unintended trilogy.

During his career, Jenkins proved himself to be a proficient editor, lending his keen editorial eye to a number of prominent projects and publications, including The Welsh Academy Encyclopaedia of Wales, published by the University of Wales Press in 2008. A highly respected pioneer of the haiku in Wales, he also co-edited the country's first national anthology of haiku poetry, Another Country (Gomer Press), in 2011.

Jenkins was a lecturer on Swansea University's Creative and Media Writing programme and, at the time of his death, lived in Mumbles, Swansea.

Death

Jenkins died in the Tŷ Olwen Hospice in Swansea on 28 January 2014, aged 64, following a short illness. His funeral was held at St. Mary's Church, Pennard, on the morning of 10 February 2014. With the church at capacity, the ceremony was relayed by audio link-up to hundreds of mourners gathered in the nearby community hall. Jenkins was then buried in the graveyard of St. Mary's, the same resting place as fellow poets Vernon Watkins and Harri Webb.

Legacy

In July 2014, The H'mm Foundation published Encounters with Nigel, an anthology of critical essays, creative pieces and tributes to Jenkins from fellow writers, former students and family members. The anthology was the third in the H'mm Foundation's Encounters series, following publications dedicated to Dylan and R. S. Thomas. It was launched at Swansea's Dylan Thomas Centre on 19 July 2014 as part of Cofio Nigel, an event celebrating Jenkins' life.

The punk band Helen Love name-checked Jenkins on their single 'Where Dylan Thomas Talks To Me', released in November 2014. The song revealed the band's desire to see the cycle path from Mumbles to Swansea being renamed 'The Nigel Jenkins Way', with lead singer Love seeing it as a fitting tribute to "a fantastic writer and poet, a maverick, a punk rocker, somebody Swansea should be really proud of."

Publications

Poetry
 1972: First Collection, Brighton
 1974: Three Young Anglo-Welsh Poets (with Tony Curtis and Duncan Bush), Welsh Arts Council
 1979: Circus, Swansea Poetry Workshop
 1981: Song and Dance, Poetry Wales Press
 1981: Warhead, Megaton Press
 1983: Practical Dreams, Galloping Dog Press
 1985: Common Ground, (with Roland Mathias, Robert Minhinnick, John Tripp, Gillian Clarke, Jeremy Hooker and Anne Stevenson, ed. Susan Butler), Poetry Wales Press
 1988: Love is a Four-Letter Word (with Dave Hughes and Penny Windsor), Lovebards Press
 1990: Acts of Union: Selected Poems 1974–1989, Gomer
 1997: Remember Tomorrow (Audio Tape), Gomer
 1998: Ambush, Gomer
 2002: A Body of Questions, Red Pagoda Press
 2002: Blue: 101 Haiku, Senryu and Tanka, Planet Books
 2006: Hotel Gwales, Gomer
 2007: O for a gun: 101 Haiku and Senryu, Planet Books

Prose
 1995: Gwalia in Khasia, Gomer
 1996: Wales: the Lie of the Land (with photographer Jeremy Moore), Gomer
 1997: Literary Wales, Wales Tourist Board
 2001: Footsore on the Frontier: Selected Essays and Articles, Gomer
 2002: Through the Green Door: Travels Among the Khasis, Penguin, India
 2008: Real Swansea, Seren
 2009: Gower (with photographer David Pearl), Gomer
 2012: Real Swansea Two, Seren
 2014: Real Gower, Seren
 2021: Damned for Dreaming, The H'mm Foundation

Plays
 1985: Strike a Light!, toured by the Made in Wales Theatre Company
 1986: Waldo's Witness, performed by Coracle Theatre

Criticism
 1989: John Tripp (Writers of Wales), University of Wales Press

As editor
 1987: Glas-Nos: Cerddi Dros Heddwch/Poems for Peace (ed. with Menna Elfyn), CND Cymru
 1992: The Works, Welsh Union of Writers
 1995: Khasia in Gwalia, Alun Books
 1995: Thirteen Ways of Looking at Tony Conran, Welsh Union of Writers
 2008: The Welsh Academy Encyclopaedia of Wales (co-ed.), University of Wales Press
 2011: Another Country: Haiku Poetry from Wales (ed. with Ken Jones and Lynne Rees), Gomer

Radio and television scripts/presentation 
Fields of Praise (a half-hour documentary on the Urdd) for 'Kaleidoscope', BBC Radio 4, May 1987.
Gwalia yng Nghasia, a three-part documentary series for S4C, March/April 1994.
TV Ballads: At Home, BBC Wales, 1995 and BBC 2, 1996.
Gwalia in Khasia, a one-hour documentary for BBC Wales (1995).
Kardomah Boys, about Dylan Thomas and his fellow Swansea artists, in the BBC Wales 'Catalysts' series, September '97.

Prizes
1998: John Tripp Spoken Poetry Award
1996: Wales Book of the Year, for Gwalia in Khasia
1991: John Morgan Writing Award (Welsh Writers' Trust)
1976: Eric Gregory Award (Society of Authors)
1974: Welsh Arts Council's Young Poets Prize
Two Welsh Arts Council bursaries

References

External links
 
Centre for Research into the English Literature and Language of Wales Nigel Jenkins
Gomer Press Gomer Press - Books by Nigel Jenkins
Swansea University: English Department: Postgraduate Studies Homepage

British poets
2014 deaths
1949 births
People from Swansea
Anglo-Welsh poets
English-language haiku poets
British male poets
20th-century Welsh poets
21st-century Welsh poets
21st-century British male writers
20th-century British male writers
Academics of Swansea University